Indirana gundia is a species of frog found in the Western Ghats of India. It is only known from its type locality, Kempholey, Karnataka. Indirana gundia is listed among "Top 100 EDGE Amphibians". It represents a family that has been evolving independently in India for almost 50 million years.

Description
The dorsum is variable in colour, ranging from brown to yellowish, via golden, cream, pinkish and reddish hues, probably providing good camouflage against the background of decaying leaves on the forest floor. Adult frogs have long, muscular legs; the digits on both pairs of limbs are unwebbed but dilated into disc-like suckers. The head is fairly pointed and the skin has longitudinal glandular folds along the back. The mouth is wide and the buccal cavity is whitish or yellowish.

Habitat and conservation
Indirana gundia is a terrestrial frog inhabiting moist tropical forest. It is threatened by habitat loss caused by intensive livestock production, harvesting of wood and timber by local people, road construction, and the development of tourism facilities.

References

gundia
Frogs of India
Endemic fauna of the Western Ghats
EDGE species
Amphibians described in 1986